Musketeers of the Sea is a 1962 Italian adventure film directed by Steno.

Cast 

 Pier Angeli as Consuelo/Altagracia Di Lorna 
 Channing Pollock as  Pierre De Savigny 
 Aldo Ray as Moreau 
 Philippe Clay as Gosselin 
 Robert Alda as  Vice Governor Gomez 
 Raymond Bussières as Colonel Ortona 
 Carlo Ninchi as Count of Lorna 
 Mario Scaccia as King of France
 Carla Calò as Zalamea 
 Cesare Fantoni as Father Milita 
 Gino Buzzanca as Gutierrez  
 Pietro Tordi as Nostromo 
 Mario Siletti as Treasurer

References

External links

1962 films
Italian adventure films
1962 adventure films
Films directed by Stefano Vanzina
Films scored by Carlo Rustichelli
1960s English-language films
English-language French films
English-language Italian films
1960s Italian-language films
1960s multilingual films
French multilingual films
Italian multilingual films
1960s Italian films